William Dennehy may refer to:

 William Francis Dennehy (1853–1918), Irish journalist
 Billy Dennehy (born 1987), Irish footballer
 Bill Dennehy, a pseudonym used by Murray Boltinoff